Ponparappipatti  is a village panchayat in Vennandur block of Namakkal District in Tamil Nadu, India.

Geographic
Ponsorimalai

Cultural
Ponparappipatti Murugan Temple
Thenthiruvannamalai- Annamalayar Temple

References

Vennandur block